The 1969 San Jose State Spartans football team represented San Jose State College during the 1969 NCAA University Division football season.

San Jose State's 1969 season was part of the inaugural season for the Pacific Coast Athletic Association. The team was led by head coach Joe McMullen, in his first year, and played home games at Spartan Stadium in San Jose, California. They finished the season with a record of two wins and eight losses (2–8, 1–1 PCAA).

Schedule

Team players in the NFL
The following San Jose State players were selected in the 1970 NFL Draft.

Notes

References

San Jose State
San Jose State Spartans football seasons
San Jose State Spartans football